The Dunkerton Community School District is a rural public school district headquartered in Dunkerton, Iowa.  The district is mostly within Black Hawk County, with a small area in Bremer County and serves the town of Dunkerton and the surrounding rural areas.

Tim Cronin became superintendent in 2019, through a sharing agreement with Central City Community School District.

Schools
The district operates two schools in a single facility in Dunkerton:
 Dunkerton Elementary School
 Dunkerton High School

Enrollment

See also
List of school districts in Iowa

References

External links
 Dunkerton Community School District

School districts in Iowa
Education in Black Hawk County, Iowa
Education in Bremer County, Iowa